SPN may refer to:

Places
 Saipan International Airport (IATA airport code: SPN), Saipan
 Shahjahanpur railway station (station code: SPN), Uttar Pradesh, India
 Spooner Row railway station (National Rail station code: SPN), South Norfolk, England
 Spree-Neisse station (station code: SPN), Brandenburg, Germany; see List of railway stations in Frankfurt

Telecommunications, computing, cryptography
 Shortest job next, or shortest process next
 Service Principal Name (SPN), used in the Kerberos protocol
 Service provider name, stored on mobile phone subscriber identity module (SIM)
 Substitution–permutation network, a mathematical operation used in cipher algorithms
 Sum-Product Networks, a type of probabilistic machine learning model

Other uses
 Sanapaná language (ISO 639 code: spn)
 Sp(n), a type of symplectic group in mathematics
 Savanna Pastoral Neolithic, a culture and collection of societies in the archaeological record of the Rift Valley
 State Policy Network, a U.S. national network of conservative and libertarian think tanks
 Service Professionals Network, a social media and business directory website.
 Scientific pitch notation, a method to specify musical pitch
 Solitary pulmonary nodule, or coin lesion in the lung
 CD43 or SialoPhoriN, a protein
 Supramolecular polymer networks
 Shorthand for the TV show Supernatural

See also

 
 
 Sp!n
 spin (disambiguation)